Climate emergency may refer to:

 Human-caused climate change
 Climate crisis, a characterization of climate change
 Climate emergency declaration, a public declaration of a state of climate emergency